Pietro Grocco (27 June 1856, Albonese - 12 February 1916, Courmayeur) was an Italian physician.

Background
In 1879 Grocco received his medical doctorate from the University of Pavia, afterwards continuing his education in Paris and Vienna. In 1884 he was appointed director of special pathology at the University of Perugia, followed by an appointment as chair of clinical medicine at Pisa (1888).

From 1892 Grocco served as a professor in Florence, where among his many accomplishments, he founded a rabies institute. In 1892 he was also named government inspector and medical director of the baths at Montecatini.

Grocco's Triangle
In 1902 he described "Grocco's triangle", a triangular area of paravertebral dullness on the side opposite a pleural effusion. His name is also associated with "Grocco's sign", defined as acute dilatation of the heart following a muscle effort.

Selected writings 
 Triangolo paravertebrale opposto nella pleurite essudativa. Lavori dei congressi di medicina interna, Rome, 1902, 12 (1903): 190. - Grocco's triangle described.
 Lezioni di clinica medica. Milan, 1905 - Lessons of clinical medicine.

References 
 Treccani.it (biography)
 Pietro Grocco @ Who Named It

1856 births
1916 deaths
People from the Province of Pavia
University of Pavia alumni
Academic staff of the University of Perugia
Academic staff of the University of Pisa
Academic staff of the University of Florence
19th-century Italian physicians